The Tower Theatre is a historic movie theater that opened in 1927 in the Broadway Theater District of Downtown Los Angeles.

History 
The Tower Theatre, at South Broadway and West Eighth Street, was commissioned by H.L. Gumbiner. He would also build the Los Angeles Theatre in 1931.

The Tower was the first theater designed by architect S. Charles Lee. Seating 900 on a tiny site (50 feet wide by 153 feet long), replacing the 650-seat 1911 Garrick Theatre, it was designed in powerful Baroque Revival style with innovative French, Spanish, Moorish, and Italian elements all executed in terra-cotta. Its interior was modeled after the Paris Opera House. Its exterior features a prominent clock tower, the very top of which was removed after an earthquake.

The Tower was the first film house in Los Angeles to be wired for talking pictures, and it was the location of the sneak preview and Los Angeles premiere of Warner Bros.' revolutionary part-talking The Jazz Singer (1927), starring Al Jolson. It was the first theater in Los Angeles to be air conditioned.

The theater opened in 1927 with the silent film The Gingham Girl starring Lois Wilson and George K. Arthur. For a while during the early 1950s, the name was changed to the Newsreel Theater. It closed as a theatre in 1988.

Use as a filming location
The Tower Theatre's exterior and/or interior can be seen in the following films and TV series:

 The Omega Man (1971)
 The Mambo Kings (1992)
 Last Action Hero (1993)
 Fight Club (1999)
 Coyote Ugly (2000)
 Mulholland Drive (2001)
 The Prestige (2006)
 Transformers (2007)
 Twin Peaks (3rd season, 2017)
 Nike, Inc. Dream Crazy (2018 ad)

Landmark status
The Tower Theatre has been declared a Los Angeles Historic-Cultural Monument, HCM #450, by the Office of Historic Resources, Department of City Planning, City of Los Angeles.

Current use
As with many other historic theaters in Downtown Los Angeles, though largely intact, the theater was abandoned for many years because of migration of cinema attendance to Hollywood Boulevard and other Los Angeles locations. Over the years, its lobby has been leased to various vendors, and the auditorium has been used by the Living Faith Evangelical Church. 

In November 2015, the website DTLA Rising reported that Apple was interested in leasing the Tower for a retail store. Six months later, The Los Angeles Business Journal reported that Apple was "in the process of securing a lease". On August 2, 2018, The Los Angeles Times reported that Apple was submitting plans for the renovation of the building. The company also released an artist's rendering of the converted space. The refurbished space opened on June 24, 2021 as an Apple Store, with the store serving as a flagship Apple Store for Los Angeles.

See also
Los Angeles Theatre
Million Dollar Theater
Orpheum Theatre (Los Angeles)

References

External links

 Official website
 CinemaTreasures.org: Tower Theatre
 Apple Tower Theatre Press Release

Cinemas and movie theaters in Los Angeles
Movie palaces
Buildings and structures in Downtown Los Angeles
Los Angeles Historic-Cultural Monuments
Historic district contributing properties in California
National Register of Historic Places in Los Angeles
Event venues established in 1927
Theatres completed in 1927
1927 establishments in California
Baroque Revival architecture in the United States
Spanish Revival architecture in California
Theatres on the National Register of Historic Places in California